Coleophora calligoni is a moth of the family Coleophoridae. It is found in southern Russia, Turkestan and Uzbekistan.

Adults are on wing from June to August.

The larvae feed on the fruits of Calligonum species, including Calligonum junceum and Calligonum microcarpum. They create a silky case. The surface is slightly rugulose (finely wrinkled). The valve is three-sided. Larvae can be found from May to the beginning of June. Fully-fed larvae estivate and hibernate. A diapause of up to three to four years has been recorded.

References

calligoni
Moths described in 1973
Moths of Europe
Moths of Asia